Krasny Yar is a rural locality (a selo) in Kizhinginsky District, Republic of Buryatia, Russia. The population was 54 as of 2010. There are 2 streets.

Geography 
Krasny Yar is located 10 km north of Kizhinga (the district's administrative centre) by road. Kizhinga is the nearest rural locality.

References 

Rural localities in Kizhinginsky District